Floretta and Patapon (Italian:Florette e Patapon) is a 1913 Italian silent comedy film directed by Mario Caserini. It was remade in 1927 under the same title.

Cast
In alphabetical order
 Mary Bayma-Riva
 Mario Bonnard 
 Maria Caserini 
 Camillo De Riso 
 Carlotta Giani 
 Arduina Lapucci 
 Felice Metellio 
 Gentile Miotti 
 Antonio Monti 
 Letizia Quaranta 
 Vittorio Rossi Pianelli 
 Telemaco Ruggeri

References

Bibliography
 Moliterno, Gino. The A to Z of Italian Cinema. Scarecrow Press, 2009.

External links 
 

1913 films
1913 comedy films
Italian comedy films
Italian silent films
1910s Italian-language films
Films directed by Mario Caserini
Italian films based on plays
Italian black-and-white films